Nils-Eric Fougstedt (24 May 1910, in Raisio – 12 April 1961, in Helsinki) was a Finnish conductor and composer.  He attended the Helsinki Conservatory and counted Erik Furuhjelm among his teachers.

Fougstedt joined the staff of the Finnish Broadcasting Company (YLE) in 1938, where he founded the organisation's Soloist Choir, which later became the Radio Choir.  In 1944, he became the conductor of YLE's Radio Orchestra, and was elevated to Chief Conductor in 1950.  He served in the post until his death in 1961.

Fougstedt taught music theory and choral conducting at the Sibelius Academy.  He also was a member of the Swedish Royal Music Academy and received the honorary title of Professor in 1960.  His compositions included Angoscia (1954), the first Finnish dodecaphonic orchestral work, Trittico sinfonico (1958), and Aurea dicta (1959).

He is buried in the Hietaniemi Cemetery in Helsinki.

Notes

External links
Article
Biography

1910 births
1961 deaths
People from Raisio
People from Turku and Pori Province (Grand Duchy of Finland)
Finnish male composers
Finnish conductors (music)
20th-century conductors (music)
20th-century male musicians
Burials at Hietaniemi Cemetery
20th-century Finnish composers